Triflunordazepam (also known as Ro5-2904) is a drug which is a benzodiazepine derivative with high GABAA receptor affinity, and has anticonvulsant effects.

See also 
Nordazepam
Triflubazam

References 

Benzodiazepines
GABAA receptor positive allosteric modulators
Hoffmann-La Roche brands
Lactams
Trifluoromethyl compounds